Léon-Raymond Soulier (13 January 1924 – 25 December 2016) was a French Prelate of the Catholic Church. Soulier was born in Le Malzieu-Ville. He was ordained a priest on 28 June 1947. Soulier was appointed bishop to the Diocese of Pamiers on 22 June 1971 and consecrated on 12 September 1971. Soulier was appointed Coadjutor Bishop to the Diocese of Limoges on 9 July 1987 and succeeded Henri Gufflet on 13 July 1988. Soulier retired from the Diocese of Limoges on 24 October 2000.

External links
Catholic-Hierarchy
Pamiers Diocese (French)
Limoges Diocese (French)

1924 births
2016 deaths
20th-century Roman Catholic bishops in France
21st-century Roman Catholic bishops in France
Bishops of Pamiers